Barry Ansell (29 September 1947 – 2 March 2018) was an English footballer who played in the Football League for Aston Villa. And later became a successful property developer in South Africa. 

He was a great race horse enthusiast and spent his last years of retirement at his golf estate home in Fancourt South Africa.  

Barry Ansell had 6 children: Mark, Sacha, Glen, Amy-lou, Kerry-Lee and Scott. 

He was married to Deidre Ansell when he passed away in 2018.

References

External links
 

1947 births
2018 deaths
Footballers from Birmingham, West Midlands
Association football defenders
English footballers
Aston Villa F.C. players
Arcadia Shepherds F.C. players
English Football League players
Place of death missing